The Last Alarm is a public art work by artist Robert Daus. It is located in front of the Milwaukee Fire Department headquarters in downtown Milwaukee, Wisconsin at 7th and Wells Streets.

Description
The sculpture consists of bronze boots, jacket, gloves and helmet stacked neatly as if in preparation for a funeral procession. The boots stand upright and face forward, and the jacket is folded neatly on top. Gloves rest on top of the jacket and beneath a helmet bearing the Milwaukee Fire Department insignia. The sculpture is mounted on a black granite pedestal inscribed with the names of workers who sacrificed their lives fighting fires. A brick plaza surrounds the work.

References

1996 sculptures
Bronze sculptures in Wisconsin
Outdoor sculptures in Milwaukee